Diarsia florida, the fen square-spot, is a moth of the family Noctuidae. The species was first described by Schmidt in 1859. It is found from western Europe, Denmark, southern Norway and southern Sweden, east to Romania and Siberia. Subspecies perturbata is found in south-eastern Turkey.

The wingspan is about 34 mm. The ab. florida Schmidt (10 c) appears to be only a brightly coloured and well-marked form [ of Diarsia rubi ]. It may be a fenland ecotype of rubi. 

The larvae feed on Athyrium, Betula, Calluna, Caltha, Lamium, Primula, Rubus, Rumex, Scrophularia, Struthiopteryx, Vaccinium and Urtica species.

Subspecies
Diarsia florida florida
Diarsia florida perturbata (south-eastern Turkey)

Similar species

Diarsia florida is difficult to certainly distinguish from its congeners. See Townsend et al.

Protolampra sobrina (Duponchel, 1843) 
Diarsia mendica  ssp. mendica (Fabricius, 1775) 
Diarsia mendica ssp. thulei (Staudinger, 1891) 
Diarsia mendica ssp. orkneyensis (Bytinski-Salz, 1930) 
Diarsia rubi (Vieweg, 1790)

References

External links

Lepiforum e.V.

Diarsia
Moths of Europe
Moths of Asia
Moths described in 1859